Ferenc Hammang (born 20 May 1944) is a Hungarian fencer, who won a bronze medal in the team sabre competition at the 1980 Summer Olympics in Moscow together with György Nébald, Rudolf Nébald, Imre Gedővári and Pál Gerevich.

Is currently the trainer of FKV (Fechtklub Villach).

References

1944 births
Living people
Hungarian male sabre fencers
Fencers at the 1976 Summer Olympics
Fencers at the 1980 Summer Olympics
Olympic fencers of Hungary
Olympic bronze medalists for Hungary
Martial artists from Budapest
Olympic medalists in fencing
Medalists at the 1980 Summer Olympics